Al Slater is a former Canadian Paralympic powerlifter. He won the silver medal in the men's 82.5 kg event at the 1984 Summer Paralympics held in Stoke Mandeville, United Kingdom and New York City, United States. He also competed in several athletics events.

References

External links 
 

Living people
Year of birth missing (living people)
Place of birth missing (living people)
Paralympic silver medalists for Canada
Medalists at the 1984 Summer Paralympics
Paralympic medalists in powerlifting
Canadian powerlifters
Athletes (track and field) at the 1984 Summer Paralympics
Powerlifters at the 1984 Summer Paralympics
20th-century Canadian people